The rare earth industry in China is a large industry. Rare earths are a group of elements on the periodic table with similar properties. Rare earth metals are used to manufacture everything from electric vehicles (EVs), wind turbines, consumer electronics and other clean energy technologies. The rare earths cause improved system performance when for example electric battery terminal LiMn2O4 cathodes are doped with them, and it is known that some EVs use lithium-ion batteries such as these. Tesla automobiles "currently uses an lithium-nickel-cobalt-aluminum (NCA) chemistry, while lithium-nickel-manganese-cobalt (NMC) chemistries are common across the rest of the EV industry." Vehicle "manufacturers are keen to reduce reliance on rare earths, which like cobalt, suffers from highly concentrated supply and unpredictable pricing, with China holding a virtual global monopoly in primary supply and processing." Leading battery manufacturer Samsung SDI uses this technology for its phone and portable computer batteries.

The elements are also important to national governments because they are used in the defense industry. Twenty percent of rare earth demands are for use as permanent magnets. Permanent magnets can be used for a variety of applications including serving as essential components of weapons systems and high performance aircraft.

Rare earths are found in various minerals such as monazite and bastnasite. They are dispersed in low concentrations and are costly to extract from ore. Major reserves in the world exist in China, California (USA), India, Brazil, Australia, South Africa, and Malaysia. However, China accounts for over 95 percent of the world's production of rare earths. Therefore, having control of these elements puts China at a powerful position.

It is estimated the world has 99 million tonnes of rare earth reserve deposits. China's reserves are estimated to be 36 million tonnes or roughly 30 percent of the world's total reserves.

History 
In 1927, rare earths were discovered and small scale production of concentrates started as early as 1958, but the government did not have interest in the large scale potential of these elements until the 1980s and 90s.

In China, Xu Guangxian is regarded as the founding father of China's rare earth industry. A pioneer for rare earth research, Xu Guangxian came back to Peking University in China after graduating from Columbia University. In 1980, he joined as a member of the Chinese Academy of Sciences. A few years later, Xu created the State Key Laboratory of Rare Earth Materials Chemistry and Applications for research on these elements. Xu would go on to have powerful positions in the scientific community such as a Director in the National Natural Science Foundation of China, Chairman of the Chinese Chemical Society, and Vice Chairman in the Chinese Society of Rare Earths. Later in the 2000s, Xu was also influential in telling the government to adopt export quotas because he saw the potential rare earths had in the technology sector and wanted to keep these precious resources within China.

Additionally, in 1980, the Chinese Society of Rare Earths was created and just five years later, they established the China Rare Earth Information Center (CREIC).

Government support increased in 1986 with the program known as Program 863 which calls for the advancing of the country through technological breakthrough and increase research to propel the country forward economically and strategically. Another important program Program 973 was created as a basic research program to utilise science to advance the rare earth industry. During this time, the government poured funding into the resources and knowledge that were essential to the establishment of the industry.

Another form of governmental support was its encouragement to Chinese rare earth companies to partner with rare earth industries from other countries. In 1979, Japan's Inoue Japax Research worked with China to do research regarding ore analysis, ore dressing, and product application. In 1989, Ke Ning Da Industry of Ningbo, China partnered with US firm Tredas International to make 40 tons of magnets. The Chinese rare earth network later expanded to include relationships with Canada and additional countries from the West. During these ventures, the Chinese government provided more money for new facilities and the industry also received new technologies from their partners which catapulted China to the forefront of rare earth production.

In 2002, China's central government pushed forward restructuring of the domestic rare earth industry by creating two state-owned groups China Northern Rare Earth Group Company and China Southern Rare Earth Group Company. This largely failed due to opposition from powerful local authorities and local producers. Fierce competition in the local sector produced low profitability and inefficiency. This drove producers to consolidate and merge into larger companies for survival. Market forces thus accomplished what central planning could not.

As rare earth prices went up because of the restriction of export, many illegal mines were developed by organized criminals to benefit from the trade. The smuggling by organized criminal groups is harmful to China's rare earth industry as it depletes resources rapidly, deflates prices and causes supply problems for local producers. It is estimated a third of exports or 20 000 tonnes in 2008 were illegally exported from China.

It is said China contains 36 percent of the rare earth deposits in the world.

Due to Chinese export restrictions and heavy dependence of foreign countries on Chinese sources, efforts are ongoing to restart rare earth industries in other countries and to pressure countries with intensive industry, like Japan, to source rare earths elsewhere. Non-Chinese companies which will benefit from increased demand are Lynas Corporation and Alkane Resources of Australia. The Mountain Pass mine in California which has been closed since 2002 due to heavy competition from China will be restarted by Molycorp.

It has been reported that Chinese authorities will set up an industry group called The China Rare Earth Industry Association  to coordinate pricing collectively with foreign buyers. Wang Caifeng will be the chief of this industry group, which is expected to be formally established in May 2011.

Research
China has two state research facilities which provide specialized research into rare earth elements. They are the Rare Earth Materials Chemistry and Applications state key laboratory, which is associated with Peking University, and the Rare Earth Resource Utilization state key laboratory located in Changchun, Jilin province.

The Chinese rare earth industry also has two journals which publish research in rare earth minerals. They are the Journal of Rare Earth and China Rare Earth Information (CREI) Journal.
These journals are published by the Chinese Society of Rare Earths established in 1980 by Chinese rare earth researchers.

Controversy and Political Implications 
From 2000 to 2009, China's production of rare earth elements increased 77 percent to 129,000 tons while production from other reserves dropped to around 3000 tons.  Large US mining companies such as Molycorp closed due to the mix of China's abundance of rare earths and their capacities for production, the cost of labor, and stringent environmental regulations during the Nixon era. With the decreased pool of competitors, China's hold on these elements gave them a lot of power in the distribution of these commodities. The government declared these elements to be a protected and strategic good in 1990. This decision had a significant impact on foreign industries who partnered with China. Foreign investors could no longer work with rare earths except when partnered with Chinese firms. The State Development and Planning Commission gained power as all projects needed their approval. Production quotas were instigated for the miners and oftentimes quotas would be surpassed because of illegal mining by people who did not have licenses.

The Chinese government was also able to use these rare earths as a means of exerting power over other countries. As production levels reached all time highs and China declared rare earths to be protected, the government imposed tight regulations on exports. Currently, the Ministry of Commerce is responsible for setting quotas for domestic producers and for foreign joint venture producers. In 2015, a select 20 domestic producers could export elements and the export quota was 35,000 tons total for both domestic and joint venture producers. These decreasing figures alarmed other countries because they depend on China for their supply of rare earths. If China were to cut off the exports, the results for the technology sector would be disastrous. This occurred temporarily in 2010 when the Chinese had tensions with Japan due to a maritime dispute. They stopped all their exports to Japan and also reduced their exports from 40 to 30 percent. China demonstrated to the world that they would use this tactic as a means of coercion should need be. In response, the US and Japan appealed to the World Trade Organization to reduce their practices that secured the monopoly on rare earths and to stop pressuring other countries to move their jobs to China. The appeals did not induce a significant change in the way the Chinese government controls these elements today.

China's rare earth industry is of significance to the United States and the rest of the world today because of the increasing demands for tech products. Tesla's shift to a magnetic motor for its Model 3 Long Range car will catapult sales for neodymium. Because of the export quota, prices for rare earths are rising. The current cost for 1 kilogram of neodymium is 70 US dollars. However, it is expected to increase as 3,300 of the 31,700 tons of global demands were not met in 2017 and it is calculated that the demand will increase to around 39,000 tons by 2019. Therefore, countries are going to have to find ways to reduce rare earth usage, mine their own, or pay ever increasing prices.

In addition, political relations play a large factor in the distribution of these commodities. In 2018, US President Donald Trump proposed tariffs on technology products imported from China. As a result, China immediately responded with tariffs on US goods. Were the Chinese to impose sanctions on these elements just like what happened with Japan in 2010, the US technology sector would be greatly harmed. US companies such as Apple and Boeing get the materials and labor from China and a significant part of their profits come from China's large market.

Major firms and organizations
The Chinese rare earth industry is dominated by local state owned enterprises, private firms and centrally owned state firms.

In northern China, rare earth industry is dominated by  the Inner Mongolia Baotou Steel Rare-Earth Hi-Tech Company. In southern China, China Minmetals is the dominant player in the region. Other major players include the Aluminum Corporation of China Limited and China Non-Ferrous Metal Mining.

China announced the formation of a new conglomerate, China Rare-Earths Group, created by a merger of companies and subsidiaries including China Minmetals, Aluminum Corporation of China Limited, Ganzhou Rare Earth Group, among others.

Environmental Impact 
The US stopped their mining operations in part because of the immense pollution from the practices to extract these rare earths. However, as the main producer for the world, China did not waver but rather increased their production levels. The major cities in which rare earths were mined are Shandong, Inner Mongolia, Sichuan, Jiangxi, Guangdong, Fujian, Hunan, and Guangxi. This has caused lasting damage to the villages surrounding the factories.

The sewage produced from the factories were dumped into nearby ponds and rivers. According to accounts from a resident of Bayan Obo, a major production center, "Before the factories were built, there were just fields here as far as the eye can see. In the place of this radioactive sludge, there were watermelons, aubergines and tomatoes". And during the 1980s, "Plants grew badly. They would flower all right, but sometimes there was no fruit or they were small or smelt awful". In the villages near Bayan Obo, many farmers left because crops and livestock could not survive and the remaining farmers were affected with health problems.

The reason why mining rare earths is so detrimental is because of the low concentrations of the elements in the raw ores. Therefore, factories must use various separation and refinement techniques such as acid baths and leaching which damage the environment. The major pollutants were emissions of HF, H2SO4, SO2, and NH3.

See also 
Advanced materials industry in China
Science and technology in China
Program 863
Rare Earths Trade Dispute

References

External links 
Chinese Society of Rare Earths (CSRE) 
News about Rare earth industry in China

Industry in China